Victoria cruziana (Santa Cruz water lily, water platter, yrupe, synonym Victoria argentina Burmeist.) is a tropical species of flowering plant, of the Nymphaeaceae family of water lilies native to South America, primarily Bolivia, Argentina and Paraguay. The plant is a popular water garden plant in botanical gardens where its very large leaves can reach their fullest, up to 2 m wide with a thick rim up to 20 cm high. although rims up to nine inches (23 centimeters) have been recorded. It can be grown in cooler waters than its sister within the genus, the more familiar giant waterlily, Victoria amazonica. A 25 cm diameter flower blooms for two days, arising from the underwater bud, as a white flower that turns to a deep pink on the second and final day of its bloom. V. cruziana is a thermogenetic or heat-producing plant. The plant prefers to live in colder non moving water and requires warm temperatures in order for the flower to blossom, hence the plant must distribute a lot of energy to keep itself warmer than its natural environment (above 90 degrees Fahrenheit). The floral stigma are attached to a cup that is protected by spines, and the floral cup begins heating up in the bud, then, as the flower opens, it releases a strong sweet scent to attract pollinating beetles, then continues to provide heat to the flower while the beetles are pollinating.

Victoria cruziana was discovered in Bolivia on one of many expeditions through the country by Alcide d'Orbigny whose presence was sponsored by Andrés de Santa Cruz. The first collected specimens were returned to France where they were named in honor of Santa Cruz by Alcide's brother, Charles Henry Dessalines d'Orbigny.

References

Nymphaeaceae
Aquatic plants
Flora of Paraguay
Flora of Argentina
Garden plants of South America